Motiul Haque Khan (born 12 March 1933) is a Bangladeshi sitar player. He is the recipient of Shilpakala Padak in 2013 and Ekushey Padak in 2018.

Career
Khan started teaching music at Bulbul Lalitkala Academy in 1957. He played sitar in the inaugural day of Bangladesh Television in 1964.

References

Living people
1933 births
People from Brahmanbaria district
20th-century Bangladeshi male singers
20th-century Bangladeshi singers
Sitar players
Recipients of the Ekushey Padak